The 1916 United States Senate elections were elections that coincided with the re-election of President Woodrow Wilson. This was the first election since the enactment of the Seventeenth Amendment that all 32 Class 1 Senators were selected by direct or popular elections instead of state legislatures. Special elections were also held to fill vacancies. Republicans gained a net of two seats from the Democrats.

Results Summary 
Majority party: Democratic (54 seats)

Minority party: Republican (42 seats)

Other parties: 0

Total seats: 96

Gains, losses, and holds

Retirements
Four Republicans and two Democrats retired instead of seeking re-election.

Defeats
Nine Democrats and five Republicans sought re-election but lost in the primary or general election.

Change in composition

Before the elections

Elections results

Race summaries

Special elections during the 64th Congress 
In these special elections, the winner was seated during 1916 or before March 4, 1917; ordered by election date.

Elections leading to the 65th Congress 
In these general elections, the winners were elected for the term beginning March 4, 1917; ordered by state.

All of the elections involved the Class 1 seats.

Closest races 
Eighteen races had a margin of victory under 10%:

Arizona

Arkansas (special) 

Three-term Democratic Senate President pro tempore James Paul Clarke died October 1, 1916.

Democrat William F. Kirby was elected November 7, 1916, to finish the term.  He served  only the rest of this term, losing renomination in 1920.

California

Connecticut

Delaware

Florida

Indiana 

There were two elections held November 7, 1916, due to a vacancy. The elections converted both seats from Democratic to Republican, thus marking the first time since the popular-election of Senators was mandated by the Seventeenth Amendment three years earlier that both Senate seats in a state flipped from one party to the other in a single election cycle.

Indiana (special) 

Two-term Democrat Benjamin F. Shively was re-elected in 1914 and served until he died March 14, 1916.  Democrat Thomas Taggart was appointed by Governor Samuel Ralston on March 20 to continue the term until a November 7, 1916, special election.  Taggart lost the special election to Republican James Eli Watson.

Watson would finish out the term, be re-elected twice, and serve until his 1932 re-election loss.

Indiana (regular) 

One-term Democrat John W. Kern was elected in 1911.  He lost re-election to Republican Harry Stewart New.

New served only until losing renomination in 1922. Kern died on August 17, 1917, the same year he left the U.S Senate.

Maine 

There were two elections due to a vacancy.  Both elections were held September 11, 1916, as Maine routinely held its annual elections in September at the time.

Maine (special) 

One-term Republican Edwin C. Burleigh was elected in 1913, and died June 16, 1916.  Republican Bert M. Fernald was elected September 12, 1916, to finish the term.

Fernand would later be re-elected twice and serve until his 1926 death.

Maine (regular) 

One-term Democrat Charles Fletcher Johnson was elected in 1911.  He lost re-election to Republican Frederick Hale.

Hale would later be re-elected three times and serve until his 1935 retirement.

Maryland

Massachusetts

Michigan

Minnesota

Mississippi

Missouri

Montana

Nebraska

Nevada

New Jersey

New Mexico

New York

North Dakota

Ohio

Pennsylvania

Rhode Island

Tennessee

Texas

Utah

Vermont 

The 1916 United States Senate election in Vermont took place on November 7, 1916. It was the second direct election for the U.S. Senate to take place in Vermont following the ratification of the Seventeenth Amendment to the United States Constitution and the first for Vermont's Class I seat. The incumbent, Republican Carroll S. Page successfully ran for re-election to a second full term.

In the primary election, which was held on September 11, Page gained re-nomination by winning 62 percent of the vote to defeat former governor Allen M. Fletcher (20.3) and current governor Charles W. Gates (17.7).

With the Republican Party dominant in Vermont, as it had been since its founding in the 1850s, Democratic candidate Oscar C. Miller was little more than a token opponent for Page. In the general election, Page defeated Miller 74.4 percent to 23.5.

Virginia

Washington

West Virginia

Wisconsin

Wyoming

See also 
 1916 United States elections
 1916 United States House of Representatives elections
 64th United States Congress
 65th United States Congress

Notes

References